George Hunter  (1921 – 10 April 2013) was a Canadian documentary photographer who spent seven decades capturing industrial and landscape scenes on film.

Career
He was born in Regina, Saskatchewan, and started taking photographs professionally for the newspapers like the Winnipeg Tribune. He worked for the Tribune during World War II. He also worked for the National Film Board of Canada (NFB) in the 1940s. After the war, he turned to freelance work. One of his main stylistic features is the use of aerial photography, since he was also an airplane pilot.

His most high-profile work appeared in Time magazine in the mid-1950s, when his work on American landscapes, photographed at dusk were highlighted in the 20 September 1954 issue's 12-page article entitled "The U.S. After Dark". His work is represented in collections nationwide, including more than one hundred works at the Canadian Museum of Contemporary Photography. He lived his later years in his home/studio located in Mississauga, Ontario. Hunter died in Mississauga's Credit Valley Hospital on 10 April 2013, aged 92.

Honours
He was one of the first photographers to be accepted into the Royal Canadian Academy of Arts and is a founding member of the Canadian Heritage Photography Foundation. Three of his images graced the Canadian five, ten, fifty dollar bills. One of his photographs of Toronto's Pearson International Airport was included as part the Voyager 2 spaceprobe's time capsule. The Canadian Association of Photographers and Illustrators gave him a lifetime achievement award in 2001.

Public collections
The Rooms Provincial Art Gallery, Art Gallery of Nova Scotia, Sherman Hines Photography Museum, New Brunswick Museum, Confederation Centre Art Gallery, Canadian Centre of Architecture, McCord Museum, Montreal Museum of Fine Art, Montreal Historic Centre, Canadian Museum of Civilization, North Shore Regional Museum, Canadian Museum of Contemporary Photography, Library and Archives Canada, Portrait Gallery of Canada, Art Gallery of Ontario, Robarts Library (University of Toronto), Mississauga Art Gallery, Manitoba Museum (HBC Collection), Winnipeg Art Gallery, Moose Jaw Museum and Art Gallery, Whyte Museum of the Rockies, Atlas Coal Mines National Historic Park, Vancouver Art Gallery, Art Gallery of Greater Victoria, Royal British Columbia Museum, Maritime Heritage Centre, N.W.T. Mining Heritage Society, Prince of Wales Northern Heritage Centre, MacBride Museum, Barbados Museum and Historical Society, Workers Arts and Heritage Centre.

Legacy
In May 2017, the NFB and Canadian publisher Firefly Books announced that a selection of Hunter's work would be published in book form as George Hunter's Canada: Iconic Images from Canada's Most Prolific Photographer.

References

External links
  Canadian Heritage Photography Foundation
 2010 video interview conducted by the Art Gallery of Ontario
 "A Letter From The Publisher, Sep. 20, 1954". Time. 20 September 1954. About "The U.S. After Dark" project.

1921 births
2013 deaths
Artists from Regina, Saskatchewan
Canadian photographers
Documentary photographers
Industrial photographers
Members of the Royal Canadian Academy of Arts
National Film Board of Canada people
Time (magazine) people